Poul Bilde (27 March 1938 – 15 April 2021) was a Danish footballer. He played in eight matches for the Denmark national football team from 1965 to 1968.

References

External links
 
 

1938 births
2021 deaths
Danish men's footballers
Denmark international footballers
Footballers from Aarhus
Association football forwards
Randers FC players
Vejle Boldklub players